The 1945–46 Iowa State Cyclones men's basketball team represented Iowa State University during the 1945-46 NCAA College men's basketball season. The Cyclones were coached by Louis Menze, who was in his eighteenth season with the Cyclones. They played their home games for the last time at the State Gymnasium in Ames, Iowa.

They finished the season 8–8, 5–5 in Big Six play to finish in third place.

Roster

Schedule and results 

|-
!colspan=6 style=""|Regular Season

|-

References 

Iowa State Cyclones men's basketball seasons
Iowa State
Iowa State Cyc
Iowa State Cyc